Alejandro Jose Zamora Moya, (born July 13, 1979) known professionally as Zamora, is a Venezuelan musician.
Two of his albums have been nominated for Grammy Awards for Best New Age Album: Instrumental Oasis, Vol. 4 in 2010 and Instrumental Oasis, Vol. 6 in 2011.

He has recorded several instrumental and solo piano albums.

Zamora taught himself to play the piano and other keyboard instruments. He has composed more than 100 solo piano and instrumental songs.

Zamora ran twice for President of Venezuela, in 2012 and 2018.

His music has been featured in several album compilations titled “Sounds From The Circle”, created by Suzanne Doucet.

His self-published book Pensamientos, Proverbios y Reflexiones (Thoughts, Proverbs and Reflections) was released in 2009.  He has also published several books with the scores for his music compositions.

He lives in Los Angeles and Venezuela.

Official releases

Bibliography

Discography 

 Instrumental Oasis, Vol. 1 (CD)
 Instrumental Oasis, Vol. 2 (CD)
 Instrumental Oasis, Vol. 3 (CD)
 Instrumental Oasis, Vol. 4 (CD)
 Instrumental Oasis, Vol. 5 (CD)
 Instrumental Oasis, Vol. 6 (CD)
 Instrumental Oasis, Vol. 7 (CD)
 Instrumental Oasis, Vol. 8 (CD)
 Instrumental Oasis, Vol. 9 (CD)
 The Best of Zamora (CD)
 0 Stress (CD)
 Solo Piano (CD)
 VOX (CD)

Videography 

 Instrumental Oasis, Vol. 1 (DVD)
 Instrumental Oasis, Vol. 2 (DVD)
 Instrumental Oasis, Vol. 3 (DVD)
 Instrumental Oasis, Vol. 4 (DVD)
 Instrumental Oasis, Vol. 5 (DVD)
 Instrumental Oasis, Vol. 6 (DVD)
 Instrumental Oasis, Vol. 7 (DVD)

References

External links 
 Official website

1979 births
Living people
New-age pianists
Venezuelan musicians
Venezuelan pianists
Venezuelan male composers
Musicians from Caracas
Place of birth missing (living people)
Male pianists
21st-century pianists
21st-century male musicians